"Get on the Bus" is a song recorded by American group Destiny's Child, featuring musician Timbaland, for the original motion picture soundtrack of Gregory Nava's romantic drama Why Do Fools Fall in Love (1998). It was written and produced by Timbaland and Missy Elliott. As with other Timbaland's 1990s productions, the song features some unorthodox elements, including bird sounds. It was released as the second single from Why Do Fools Fall in Love on September 21, 1998 by Columbia Records and Elektra Records.

"Get on the Bus" was a moderate commercial success throughout Europe, reaching the top 20 in the Netherlands and the United Kingdom. In the United States, it received minor airplay on urban contemporary radio, peaking at number 63 on the US R&B/Hip-Hop Airplay chart. An accompanying music video for the song was directed by Earle Sebastian. The song was later included on the international editions of Destiny's Child's second studio album The Writing's on the Wall (1999) and included in the set list of their 2001–2002 world tour.

Music video
An accompanying music video was directed by Earle Sebastian. It focuses on Destiny's Child, performing in a silver-white room and inside and around a Lincoln Navigator SUV. The members are dressed in white clothes. Timbaland makes a guest appearance during his rap verses. Singer Aaliyah choreographed the dance routines throughout.

Formats and track listings

Credits and personnel
Credits adapted from the liner notes of The Writing's on the Wall.

 Jimmy Douglass – engineering, mixing
 Missy Elliott – writing, production
 Beyoncé Knowles – vocals
 LeToya Luckett – vocals

 LaTavia Roberson – vocals
 Kelly Rowland – vocals
 Timbaland – mixing, vocals, writing, production
 Todd Wachsmuth – engineering/mixing assistance

Charts

Weekly charts

Year-end charts

Release history

References

External links
 

1998 singles
Destiny's Child songs
Missy Elliott songs
Timbaland songs
Songs written for films
Songs about buses
Song recordings produced by Timbaland
Songs written by Missy Elliott
Songs written by Timbaland
Hip hop soul songs